The Center of Advanced European Study and Research (CAESAR) was founded in 1995 as part of the compensatory actions under the Berlin/Bonn law, which were intended to support structural change in the region of the former capital.

In 2022, the institute became a full member of the Max Planck Society and is now called Max Planck Institute for Neurobiology of Behavior – caesar.

Until 2021, the independent foundation operated under private law with foundation capital from the governments of Germany and the State of North Rhine-Westphalia.

caesar was closely associated with the Max Planck Society (MPG). The President of the Max Planck Society chaired the board of trustees. The caesar-directors have been scientific members of the Max Planck Society. The appointment of the directors, the evaluations and the safeguarding of scientific excellence were realized according to the criteria of the Max Planck Society.

The foundation operated a research center, which did research in the field of neurosciences with modern photonic, molecular biological and chemical methods as well as methods of microtechnology. Here, particularly optical methods have been utilized for brain research and brain control. Over the years, the focus was more and more on neuroethology and on the question how brains control behavior.

Within the main building is also the Life Science Inkubator (LSI). The LSI ist a public–private partnership (PPP), and one partner is CAESAR. Other partners are e.g. Fraunhofer Society and Helmholtz Association of German Research Centres.

External links

References 

Max Planck Institutes
Foundations based in Germany
University of Bonn